SC 7 was the code name for a large Allied World War II convoy of 35 merchant ships and six escorts, which sailed eastbound from Sydney, Nova Scotia, for Liverpool and other United Kingdom ports on 5 October 1940. While crossing the Atlantic, the convoy was intercepted by one of the first Kriegsmarine submarine wolfpacks. During the ensuing battle, the escort was completely overwhelmed and 20 of the 35 cargo vessels were sunk and 2 more damaged, with 141 lives lost. The disastrous outcome of the convoy demonstrated the German submarines' potential of being able to work more efficiently using wolfpack tactics and the inadequacy of British anti-submarine tactics at the time.

Ships of the convoy

The slow convoy SC 7 left Sydney, Nova Scotia on 5 October 1940 bound for Liverpool and other British ports. The convoy was supposed to make  but several merchant ships were much slower, necessitating a further reduced speed. The convoy consisted of older, smaller ships, mostly with essential cargoes of bulk goods. Much of the freight on these ships originated on Canada's east coast, especially from points to the north and east of Sydney. Typical cargoes included pit props from eastern New Brunswick for British coal mines, lumber, pulpwood, grain from the Great Lakes ports, steel and steel ingots from the Sydney plant and iron ore from Newfoundland, bound for the huge steel plants of Wales. The largest ship in the convoy was the 9,512-ton oil tanker , belonging to the Admiralty, which was bound for the Clyde with fuel for the Royal Navy. Another ship, the British , carried a valuable cargo of trucks.

Many of the ships were British but the convoy included Greek, Swedish, Norwegian and Dutch vessels. As convoy commodore, Mackinnon was in charge of the good order of the merchant ships but did not command the escort. The  sloop  was sole naval escort for the first three quarters of the journey. There was no aircraft protection in 1940 for Allied ships in the Atlantic Ocean after leaving coastal regions. Scarborough would have had little chance against a surface attack by a German raider. Many of the merchant ship captains were resentful at having to sail in convoy and would have preferred to take their chances on their own, rather than risk such a slow crossing with a weak escort. They were often uncooperative; at one point early in the voyage Scarboroughs captain was shocked to find a Greek merchant ship in the convoy travelling at night with her lights on.

Battle

5–18 October
The convoy sailed on Saturday 5 October 1940. On the first day, one ship,  dropped out with mechanical trouble, and had to return to port. The convoy "ran into a gale" on 8 October and then were engaged by U-boats. As bad weather set in on 11 October, several ships became separated and were forced to sail independently. One of these, was a small Canadian Laker of 1,813 tons, with a cargo of lumber destined for Scotland. A fourth straggler regained the convoy on 15 October.

On 17 October, as the convoy entered the Western Approaches, Scarborough was joined by the sloop  and the new corvette . Scarborough counter-attacked, driving U-48 deep so she was unable to shadow or report but the attack was prolonged unwisely and the convoy moved so far ahead that Scarborough was unable to rejoin. On 18 October SC 7 was joined by the sloop  and the corvette , with Leith assuming command. Later that day, U-38 sighted the convoy and attacked, damaging . Leith and Heartsease attacked without success, though U-38 was driven off and Heartsease was detailed to escort Carsbreck home, weakening the escort further.

18/19 October

On the night of 18/19 October,  and  made a concerted attack. U-99 and U-100  were captained by two famous aces, Korvettenkapitäns Otto Kretschmer and Joachim Schepke. The attack was coordinated from Lorient by Admiral Karl Dönitz and his staff. An early casualty was the iron ore ship, bound for Cardiff, Wales. With her heavy cargo, she sank quickly, taking all 36 crew members with her. She sank quickly as well, taking with her 38 of her 39-man crew. Also among the casualties was the commodore's ship, Assyrian, which went down with 17 crew (Mackinnon was rescued after a long immersion in the chilly waters). In all, 16 ships were lost in this six-hour period.

18–20 October
On 18 October,  was torpedoed by U-101 and was abandoned. She was torpedoed again on 19 October by U-100 but remained afloat. She was towed to the Clyde and later repaired at Greenock. The escorts were unable to prevent any of these losses; their responses were uncoordinated and ineffective. They never realised that the attacking submarines did not attack submerged or from outside the convoy, but were actually running surfaced between the ships inside the convoy. Therefore, the escorts were unable to mount any serious attacks on the U-boats, and had to spend much of their time rescuing survivors. During 19 October, the escorts, loaded with survivors, gathered together those ships that remained. Fowey collected eight ships and made for the Clyde, arriving there a few days later. Scarborough passed through the scene of the battle later on 19 October; she found wreckage, but no survivors. Later that afternoon Leith met Heartsease, still escorting the damaged Carsbreck; together they headed for Gourock, Renfrewshire, collecting two more stragglers on the way. Bluebell with over 200 survivors on board, headed directly for the Clyde, arriving on 20 October.

Aftermath
SC 7 had lost 20 ships out of 35, of which seven fell to Kretschmer's U-99. The arrival of convoy HX 79 in the vicinity had diverted the U-boats and they went on to sink 12 ships from HX 79 that night.
No U-boats were lost in either engagement. The loss of 28 ships in 48 hours made 18 and 19 October the worst two days for shipping losses in the entire Atlantic campaign. The attack on SC 7 was a vindication of the U-boat Arm's wolfpack tactic, and was the most successful U-boat attack of the Atlantic campaign. The convoy escort was ineffective in guarding against the attack. Convoy tactics were rudimentary at this early stage of the war. The escorts' responses were uncoordinated, as the ships were unused to working together with a common battle-plan. Command fell to the senior officer present, and could change as each new ship arrived. The escorts were torn between staying with the convoy, abandoning survivors in the water, as DEMS regulations demanded, and picking them up, leaving the convoy unprotected and risking being torpedoed themselves.

See also
 Battle of the Atlantic

References

Sources
 Paul Lund, Harry Ludlam: The Night of the U-Boats  (1973)  
 
 Dan van der Vat : The Atlantic Campaign (1988)  
 Arnold Hague : The Allied Convoy System 1939–1945 (2000) .  (Canada).   (UK)
 John Keegan : Intelligence In War (2002)

Further reading
 

SC007
Naval battles of World War II involving Canada
Naval battles of World War II involving Germany
Naval battles of World War II involving the United Kingdom